The discography of Snow Tha Product, a Mexican-American rapper, consists of one studio album, one extended play (EP), four compilation albums, eight mixtapes and forty-one singles (including six as a featuring artist).

Studio albums

Compilation albums

EPs

Mixtapes

Singles

As lead artist

As featured artist

Music videos

As lead artist

Guest appearances

Other songs

References

Hip hop discographies
Discographies of American artists